Airbull Suttiwan (born 6 March 1961) is a Thai air force officer. From 1 October 2020 to 30 September 2021, he served as commander-in-chief of the Royal Thai Air Force. Napadej Dhupatemiya was appointed as his successor.

References 

Living people
1961 births
Place of birth missing (living people)
Airbull Suttiwan
Airbull Suttiwan